Ecological Marxism, eco-socialism, and ecological civilization encompass the large effort to name the movement inside the Chinese Communist Party (CCP) to fix and reform the environmental sector in response to the looming climate crisis. These terms can be defined differently by various thinkers, but all are linked as the possible heir to socialism and the theory of how to fix the climate crisis. Ecological Marxism is defined as that capitalism accumulation has led to the eventual collapse of the environment through commodifying aspects of nature. Eco-socialism is like ecological Marxism but differs in the fact that it infuses traditional socialism with the environmental movement. Ecological civilization is the current term used the Chinese government as to explain their new environmental policy, yet whether it ranges in radical, or conservative is determined on who is analyzing the policy. While all these theories share similar foundations and views of the future, they all are theoretically different and view the methods to obtain their future differently. These theories have made an impact on China and the CCP in general on how they implement environmental protection and the language they use to describe the policies

Theoretical overview

Ecological Marxism 
Ecological Marxism emerged in 1979 in the book Western Marxism: An Introduction, Classical and Contemporary sources by Ben Agger. Though it has been discussed since then by a wide array of thinkers, there is no set definition of the term, but more a collection of varying ideas. The term is based on the idea that the effects of capitalist accumulation and growth on the environment will lead to eventual collapse and that commodifying nature is unmanageable. The term ecological Marxism can be misleading since many can believe it will have a lot of scientific influences. Rather ecology in this theory is referring to movements and ideas about nature and how capitalism relates to it. It discusses the failure in capitalists understanding of seeing nature and its sources as inexhaustible and the relentless pollution and degradation of these natural resources. James O'Connor explains that ecological Marxism is "the drive for the endless accumulation of capital—and the state apparatuses that support that drive—leads to the undermining of the very processes that enable the reproduction of capital." Capitalism is inherently anti-ecological because its rests upon the destruction of the surrounding environment for the sake of accumulation. This accumulation rests upon having an outlet of unethical actions, such as dumping, and pollution with no end in sight. Since capitalism sees its future as endless growth, the surrounding environment itself must create an endless access to extract resources and dump waste. Furthermore, the resources that allow capitalism to produce more are treated as commodities, yet these aren't real commodities. Described as 'fictitious commodities', nature cannot be given a money value and this absence of exchange value creates a violent appropriation of resources by the state and capitalists.

Ecological Marxism is seen by many in Marxist or socialist circles as the underlying principle to counter climate change and environmental degradation. Ecological Marxism hopes to explain the very processes which harm the environment and when its transparent, it can lead to end of this destruction, "we need 'socialism' at least to make the social relations of production transparent, to end the rule of market and commodity fetishism, and to end the exploitation of human beings by other human beings; we need 'ecology' at least to make the social productive forces transparent, to end the degradation and destruction of the earth." In China, ecological Marxism is being used as a guide to create a new ecological civilization. Yet while this theory may provide a basis for a new method of building China and protecting its environment, it has led to self-criticism of government policy or other nations complicity in China's environmental record. Ecological Marxism is supposed to be the antidote to capitalist logic about endless accumulation and reveal the destructive policies capitalism has on the environment. China as a socialist country is posed to be able to implement this theory easier since it rests upon Marx's critiques of capital and free markets.

Ecological Marxism in China 
There are four main reasons that Zhihe Wang says are responsible in his article "Ecological Marxism in China". The first reason is the pressing reality of the environmental disasters looming in China. Though China's growth has led to many great improvements this has resulted in environmental problems which China has to fight theoretically and literally. Secondly, the push by the government to make an ecological civilization needs a larger theoretical base to draw research and thinking from. Thirdly, because ecological Marxism doesn't stray away too far from traditional Marxism it is easier to portray ecological Marxism as simple progression in Marxist thought that doesn't derail the founding principles of communist China. Lastly, because ecological Marxism supports environmental movements within China, this allows those in these movements not be portrayed as capitalists or enemies of the state. Instead, they become the soldiers of a new movement.

Ecological civilization 
One main avenue ecological Marxism dives into is the creation of an ecological civilization. This idea is being pushed in China and the CCP as a way to solve the climate crisis. Ecological civilization tries to clarify the true meaning of civilization without the violent structure of capitalism, a utopic future. While ecological civilization does not have a set definition, this allows it to interpret in different ways of how it can be applied. Which allows China and possible others to claim it has achieved ecological civilization even if it hasn't to other theorists. China projects itself as a socialist country, able to take over the mantel of ecological Marxism and the future of ecological civilization. Currently, it engages in neoliberalism which puts China in odds of this proposed future. The way they make policy is through socialist terms and understand, but it engages in neoliberalism and market capitalist which puts it in an oxymoron situation.

Though the term emerged first in the Soviet Union in 1984, it was in China under Pan Yue, the vice-minister of China's state environmental protection administration that was promoted it within the CCP and Chinese society. The idea of ecological civilization has been embraced by the government, as central policy objective, but this has been more surface level support. Under Pan Yue he promotes the idea of "green GDP" which takes into account environmental damage to show that economic growth is really false. He goes on to further argue that to solve the global climate crisis, people need to be engaged and mobilized in public decision making of how to solve it. Pan Yue believes the state is responsible in mobilizing its resources in fixing the climate crisis, with the public in control of the government to control the economy. Pan Yue was able to garner support with his use of Chinese traditional thought and history by "assert[ing] that Chinese tradition is eco-centric, endorsing ideas about an intrinsic harmony between humankind and nature." He uses this interpretation of Chinese tradition to contrast with the West, arguing "Western tradition is essentially anthropocentric, placing humans in a dominant position vis-à-vis nature." By using traditional Chinese thought, particularly Confucianism he claims that ecological civilization is in line with Chinese tradition that has been forgotten.

In Chinese intellectual spaces, ecological civilization promotes the equal and peaceful coexistence of humans and the environment. This differs from government rhetoric which focus on its implementation of environmental protection policy and justice initiatives without the mention of equality of nature and man. Recently, ecological civilization has been redefined to fit larger Chinese problems rather than just environmental protection. Since Pan Yue introduction of ecological civilization to Chinese discourse it has been reformed and redefined to fit the current political preferences of the CCP that focus on green growth as argued by Caroline Garon, a capitalist form of sustainability. Ecological civilization has become an example of the struggle between intellectuals and the government on how to define the political futures of China and Marxism.

Ecological civilization in terms of China 
Since 2007, ecological civilization has been incorporated into the CCP rhetoric with Secretary General Jintao Hu working report to the 17th National Congress naming ecological civilization as a main policy objective for the government. This would bleed into the 18th National Congress report by Secretary General Jintao Hu where the implementation of an ecological civilization must be accelerated. This included reversing environmental pollution trends, more environmentally sustainable production systems, and ensuring global ecological security. To obtain the goals previously mentioned, implementation requires: revamping land-use patterns, promoting resource conservation, enhancing ecosystem protection, and supporting the growth of an eco-civilization system. Within five years the CCP moved from language of support to policy objectives on how to implement ecological civilization. To the CCP, ecological civilization has become the logical next step in supporting the growth of socialism overall, while meeting the objectives of leading environmental reform in the world. For the Chinese government, "Eco-civilization emerged as a result of the political leadership's recognition of the magnitude of environmental and climate related challenges that China is facing," and seeks to bring Chinese culture with socialism to address the problems of the climate crisis. Finally, while the Chinese government and intellectuals frame eco-civilization as a Chinese project, they also offer it as a solution for the rest of the world. Its focus on solving the climate crisis with continued economic growth, is appealing to any country that wishes to take the climate crisis seriously. This version of ecological civilization would not be in competition with global capitalism since "it does not suggest any radical turn towards slow and resilient growth combined with major redistributive measures, either at the global level or within China."

General Secretary Xi Jinping relationship with ecological civilization 
Since becoming General secretary in 2012, Xi Jinping has led the response and direction of the CCP regarding ecological civilization. As General Secretary and his previous leadership roles he has championed eco-civilization, even coining a popular phrase "clean waters and lush mountains are gold and silver." His theoretical viewpoint has 5 main points. First its foundations start with Marxist philosophy which centers upon the relationship between nature and humans. Second, it also builds upon traditional Chinese ecological thought on the ideas of unity of man and nature. Next, ecological civilization follows a progression of increasing environmental thought due to ecological crises. With the most looming crisis of all, the climate crisis, ecological civilization becomes a more radical approach to face this crisis. Fourth, the move toward sustainable development across the world, has pushed Xi to make a sustainable development plan that has Chinese characteristics and can lead the global movement. Lastly, it sustains the process of Sinification of socialism. To make this theory a real-life system 5 reforms need to be taken as required by Xi Jinping. First, "an ecological cultural system to enhance the whole society's scientific and moral capability of ecological civilization under the guidance of ecological values." Secondly, the new economic system created should incorporate environmental assessment into the development of industrialization, forming the two into one being. Third, targets for ecological quality that sets a minimum of requirement. Fourth, the streamline of environmental law, legislation, and policy into one structure that complements the government. Fifth, a security of the environment that focuses on prevention of disasters.

Socialist ecologcial civilization 
If China moves to create a socialist ecological civilization, its development rests upon three fundamentals. First, profits are no longer priority, instead the well-being of people becomes the purpose for economic activities. Next, economic development priority will be replaced by ecological sustainability for all levels of government. This will be due to the recognition that wealth cannot be the preference when civilization at the current time is unsustainable, and the future growth will be even more ambiguous. Lastly, large scale economic development projects will and are no longer desirable due to the change in the perception and understanding of unlimited growth as a fallacy. This understanding of ecological civilization is not seen as a form of green capitalism but instead as the next form of socialism against capitalism. The move towards ecological civilization in China would mean a move away from the growth market focus and move China into an era of socialist priority.

For China to implement ecological civilization, a new institutional system needs to be created to support the transition and development of a new political, economic, and social structure. Yue Pan describes the new laws and regulations put in place for the environment which allows for the "ecological progress becomes an ideal testing field for the rule of law."

Ecological socialism 
Ecological Marxism also spreads into the domain of ecological socialism, or eco-socialism, which seeks to be the antithesis to neoliberalism. Its critique of capitalism explores the way "capitalist production relationships influence or otherwise shape the productive forces (defined as land, energy, raw materials, technology, machinery, labor skills, work organization, and other means and objects of production and also as housing, transport, and other means and objects of reproduction or consumption)." Eco-socialism takes traditional socialism reforms it to include environmental issues, describing a utopian society of direct democracy, decentralization, communal ownership, and focus on the local stakeholder. Eco-socialism as theorized by E.P. Thompson exists only with a moral economy, an economy that is based on non-monetary and other economic criteria such as the environment and social spheres. Eco-socialism reimagines the way the economy works but not through commodifying those that aren't given value. In capitalism based on ecological socialism theory, "to preserve ecological diversity, avoid ecological debts to other workplaces and future generations, promote the intellectual development of the worker, and the like are subordinated to production for profit... ecological 'goods' are sacrificed to need to realize exchange value in the market." In these terms, capitalism can never prioritize the environment since it will always in contradiction of profit. Additionally, man sees that with nature's limits, the community must become a steward to protect the environment and benefit all members. Overall eco-socialism is the "theories and movements that seek to subordinate exchange-value to use-value, by organizing production as a function of social needs and the requirements of environmental protection. Their aim, an ecological socialism, would be an ecologically rational society founded on democratic control, social equality, and the predominance of use-value."

Eco-socialism in China 
Eco-socialism research in China began in the 1980s and has focused on three main themes: Marx's and Engels thoughts on the relationship of nature and humans, Western eco-socialists and eco-socialists' analyses of socialism with Chinese characteristics. Ecological civilization in China has become the future utopia once industrial civilization has ended. Though it only can be thought of as the technical term for how to solve ecological problems with technological solutions, similar to the method the West has taken. Yet it can take a radical view that the centralization of the government by capitalism should be challenged by institutions that subordinate markets and empower individuals at the local level.

Ecological Marxism in use 
To address environmental problems in the theoretical sphere, the three major political ecologies used are national environmental protection policy, sustainable development strategy, and scientific concept of development.

Environmental protection national policy 1978–1991 
In 1978 when China moved the political conscious from class struggle to economic construction, it in turn welcomed environmental protection. But economic modernization still gained priority when in competition with the environmental protection.

Sustainable development strategy 1992–2001 
This strategy was adopted when China was to attend the Rio summit, and to follow the international treaties on environmental protections, new national laws were made to meet the standards. This led to a new philosophy regarding economic development and environmental protection—both can be achieved at the same time if the economic goals are framed in environmentally safe methods.

Scientific concept of development/ecological Modernization, 2002 onwards 
To ensure the Chinese economy achieves a highly competitive and long growth, it has to make plans to carry out a transformation focusing on scientific development that is still environmentally friendly. This would be the foundation for the ecological civilization that Jintao Hu put forth in 2007 and 2012 in the working paper to the National Congress. This new principle works upon the idea that economic growth that is centered upon environmental harm will not help long term and is a high cost for the environment.

Forest conservation in the Greater Khingan Range, China 
The Greater Khingan Range has become a key area for forest conservation under the Natural Forest Conservation Program which seeks to lower commercial logging amounts along with illegal logging. In the article "Eco-socialism and the political ecology of forest conservation in the Greater Khingan Range, China" by Kevin Lo Liyuan Zhu, he explores the effects that state owned enterprises have over forest conservation through the lens of eco-socialism. By looking at conservation practices through an eco-socialist or political ecology lens, a cost–benefit analysis for the environment and the political social dynamics of the area can be evaluated. Political ecology "seeks to reveal the politics at work in distributing, managing, and redistributing access to natural resources, political ecology has been influential in explaining socio-ecological crises—especially in the developing world," Because nature has become commoditized, looking at the ways the forest has become politicized by different actors explains how nature and the government can either become a positive or negative feedback loop. Political ecology helps explain this phenomenon, coining the term political forest which expresses "the nature of the denaturalized forest and reveal how different groups of actors compete for access to and benefit from natural resources."

The forestry sector is heavily populated with SOE's or state-owned enterprises. With the passing of Natural Forest Conservation Program (NFCP) in 1998, this slowly changed how this area could make a profit from the SOE's. The program wished to put small incremental regulations that would allow the SOE to continue but not add to any existing environmental problems or disasters. Environmental problems in rural areas are seen by the government as caused by rural backwardness, and the use of SOEs as need to mitigate these inefficiencies. The SOEs can use land enclosure and resettlement policies to enact programs in sync with government policies. The local community has become resistant to the new changes due to their trickle-down effect. Studies see the change from traditional practices to the market-based conservation intervention as hazardous to the resident's culture with nominal environmental benefits. But local officials are found to have a greater control over the projects even if they are directed by the central government and SOEs on the overarching theme.

These SOEs are relics of the Mao era but have gone through changes in principles and structure. SOEs are more in tune with the market, being government affiliated organizations that are focused on profits. Though they are affiliated with the government, not all SOEs function the same regarding environmental protections and reformation. SOEs that are in resource-based industries located in remote areas can exhibit the most control over government management regarding environmental policy. With China's move towards environmental protection and the forestry SOE's have been restructured to hit the targets that the central government has put forth. Because they are sponsored by the state, they are given more benefits by the government to stay in business even through the restructuring process. The four reorganization processes the Liyuan Zhu identifies are "(1) declining timber sales and increasing central subsidies; (2) restructuring of work-units; (3) creating redundancies; and (4) developing new sustainable economic activities."

With the SOE in the area being the main employer, those that have been dismissed faced large issues in being able to stay in the area and contribute. Those that were still employed by the Huzhong Forestry Bureau took a pay cut but were able to improve on work conditions overall. Those that lost their job joined other millions in becoming migrant workers which continued their financial instability. Additionally eco-restructuring of the company became negatively viewed.

Declining timber sales and increasing central subsidies 
The SOE focused on the article is Huzhong Forestry Bureau (HFZB) which under the new guidelines by the government regarding forestation was given subsidies for the loss of revenue and to carry over forest conservation. They received 1666.6 million yuan from the central government from 2011 to 2017. This ensures that the company does not have to go under and runs the same amount of profit even with decreasing timber sales.

Restructuring of work units 
Workers that had originally been in work units that focused on logging, storage and management, delivery, processing, and the delivery of the processes product would be transferred to new work teams that focused on forest conservation policies such as forest supervision team, afforestation team, and social welfare and fire protection teams.

Redundancies 
While the government provides subsidies to help with the restructuring of the company this still affects the employment of workers. Many were laid off, starting with the contract workers due to lack of job security protection. But with each new period of more stringent forest protection, job layoffs would follow. Contract workers originally had no compensation until 2008 when they received a one-off compensation of 341 per service year compared to permanent workers that received 800 yuan per service year with an additional 5000 yuan per person.

New economic activities 
Since the company could no longer fulfill its original purpose with the adoption of new forestry laws by the central government the company worked to build an eco-tourism sector and collect and plant of non-timber forest products.

13th Five Year Plan 2016–2020 
One of the main policies is a national zoning plan to determine land use functions; one of the subsidiaries of this is the ecological redline policy "whereby governments designate and enforce regulatory targets on ecosystem area at the landscape level, which is considered a 'lifeline' to protect ecosystem functioning for vital services." While China has over 10,000 protected areas that cover around 18% of the country, the ecological conservation redline areas will designate areas that are the bottom line of the area to keep them healthy and biodiverse. To ensure that the ecological conservation redlines are successful reforms need to be made including new legal mechanisms of protection, ecological assessments, conversation with local stakeholders, and performance targets with benchmarks and monitoring systems to determine the success of actions. At the moment 15 provinces have created their ecological conservation redlines, accounting for about 25% of the total area of the provinces.

References 

Eco-socialism
Economy of China